The World Federation of Exchanges (WFE), formerly the Federation Internationale des Bourses de Valeurs (FIBV), or International Federation of Stock Exchanges, is the trade association of publicly regulated stock, futures, and options exchanges, as well as central counterparties (CCPs). It represents over 250 market infrastructure providers, including standalone CCPs that are not part of exchange groups. Its market operators are responsible for operating the key components of the financial world. It  was founded in 1961 and is based in London, United Kingdom.

Members
To be a member, exchanges must adhere to the WFE Membership Criteria. Candidates are selected following a peer review.

As of April 2019, the WFE had 70 members:

 Abu Dhabi Securities Exchange 
 Amman Stock Exchange 
 Athens Stock Exchange 
 Australian Securities Exchange 
 B3 Brasil Bolsa Balcão 
 Bahrain Bourse
 Bermuda Stock Exchange 
 BME Spanish Exchanges
 BSE India Limited 
 Bolsa de Comercio de Buenos Aires 
 Bolsa de Comercio de Santiago
 Bolsa de Valores de Colombia 
 Bolsa de Valores de Lima 
 Bolsa Mexicana de Valores
 Borsa Istanbul 
 Boursa Kuwait 
 Bourse de Casablanca
 Bursa Malaysia
 CBOE 
 China Financial Futures Exchange
 China Securities Depository and Clearing Corporation
 CME Group 
 Colombo Stock Exchange 
 Cyprus Stock Exchange
 Dalian Commodity Exchange
 Dar es Salaam Stock Exchange PLC
 Deutsche Börse
 Dhaka Stock Exchange Ltd.
 Dubai Financial Market
 The Depository Trust and Clearing Corporation
 The Egyptian Exchange 
 Euronext
 Ho Chi Minh City Stock Exchange
 Hong Kong Exchanges and Clearing 
 Indonesia Stock Exchange

 Intercontinental Exchange
 Japan Exchange Group
 JSE Limited 
 Kazakhstan Stock Exchange
 Korea Exchange 
 London Stock Exchange Group
 Luxembourg Stock Exchange 
 Malta Stock Exchange
 Multi Commodity Exchange of India Ltd. 
 Muscat Securities Market
 NASDAQ OMX 
 Nairobi Securities Exchange 
 National Stock Exchange of India
 Nigerian Stock Exchange 
 NZX Limited
 OCC - The Options Clearing Corporation
 Oslo Børs
 Palestine Exchange
 Philippine Stock Exchange 
 Qatar Exchange
 Saudi Stock Exchange (Tadawul)
 Shanghai Futures Exchange
 Shanghai Stock Exchange 
 Shenzhen Stock Exchange
 Singapore Exchange 
 SIX Swiss Exchange 
 Stock Exchange of Mauritius 
 Stock Exchange of Thailand 
 Taipei Exchange
 Taiwan Futures Exchange
 Taiwan Stock Exchange 
 Tel Aviv Stock Exchange 
 TMX Group 
 Zhengzhou Commodity Exchange

Suspended members
 Moscow Exchange (suspended because of the 2022 Russian invasion of Ukraine)

Affiliates

Affiliates as of April 2019 include the following:

 Barbados Stock Exchange
 Beirut Stock Exchange
 Bola Electronica de Chile
 Bolsa de Valores de Panama
 Bolsa Nacional de Valores
 Botswana Stock Exchange
 Bourse Régionale des Valeurs Mobilières
 Bucharest Stock Exchange
 Cayman Islands Stock Exchange
 Chittagong Stock Exchange
 Dhaka Stock Exchange
 Dubai Gold & Commodities Exchange
 Dutch Caribbean Securities Exchange
 FMDQ OTC Securities Exchange
 Hanoi Stock Exchange
 Indian Commodity Exchange

 Indonesia Commodity and Derivatives Exchange
 The International Stock Exchange
 Iran Fara Bourse
 Iran Mercantile Exchange
 Jamaica Stock Exchange
 MERJ Exchange
 MIAX Options
 Namibian Stock Exchange
 National Equities Exchange and Quotations
 National Stock Exchange of Australia
 Nepal Stock Exchange
 Port Moresby Stock Exchange
 Rosario Futures Exchange
 Saint-Petersburg International Mercantile Exchange
 Tehran Stock Exchange

See also
 Exchange (organized market)
 Stock exchange
 List of stock exchanges
 Federation of Euro-Asian Stock Exchanges

References

External links

 Bloomberg company profile

Business organisations based in London
Trade associations based in the United Kingdom
Organizations established in 1961
Supraorganizations